Thomas Wilfred "Tony" Vandermeer (born October 8, 1962) is a politician from Alberta, Canada, who was a member of the Legislative Assembly of Alberta from 2001 to 2004 and from 2008 to 2012. Vandermeer first ran for the Progressive Conservatives in the 1997 Alberta general election when he lost to Liberal Ed Gibbons. He ran against Gibbons again in the 2001 Alberta general election, this time defeating him by a thin margin.

Vandermeer was defeated after serving only one term in the 2004 Alberta general election in a very tight race against Liberal Dan Backs. He returned to the legislature in the 2008 Alberta election, this time representing the riding of Edmonton-Beverly-Clareview, by defeating incumbent New Democrat Ray Martin.

The 2012 election resulted in another close loss, this time to NDP candidate Deron Bilous by under 300 votes.

Electoral history

2008 Alberta general election

2012 Alberta general election

References

1962 births
Living people
Politicians from Edmonton
Progressive Conservative Association of Alberta MLAs
21st-century Canadian politicians